Rajendra Nagar is a residential colony in Lucknow, India. It is bordered by Moti Nagar on the south, Tilak Nagar on the west, and Dugawan and Raniganj on the east.

Etymology
It is named after the first President of India, Shri (Dr) Rajendra Prasad. The area is located on the same place where the famous Lucknow Session of Congress was held in 1916. After which the plotting of the space was done as a residential place. The neighbouring areas are Moti Nagar, Nehru Nagar, etc all named after Freedom Fighters of India.

Educational institutions
Navyug Kanya Vidyalaya
Navyuga Degree College
Pioneer Montessori School
City Montessori School, Near TMk.

References

Neighbourhoods in Lucknow
Memorials to Rajendra Prasad